Lac de Saint-Amans is an artificial lake in Le Truel, Aveyron, France close to Villefranche-de-Panat, and 500m above the Tarn. At an elevation of 727 m, it has surface area of 0.11 km². It is captured by the Barrage de Saint-Amans. It is a holding reservoir, taking water between the Lac de Villefranche-de-Panat and the hydro-electric power station at Le Pouget power station.

References 
Notes

Saint Amans